The Copa Ricardo Aldao (English: Ricardo Aldao Cup), popularly called Campeonato Rioplatense and Copa Río de La Plata, was an official AFA-AUF  football club competition contested annually, albeit irregularly, between the league champions of Argentina and Uruguay. The trophy was donated by Argentine football executive Ricardo Aldao (1863–1956), who would later become president of the Argentine Football Association.

The cup is one of several inter-South American club competitions that have been organised on the continent. The first competition was scheduled for the 1913 season (although it was never played) and the last in 1955 (actually played in 1959, no champions proclaimed). The Copa Ricardo Aldao is seen today as the first stepping-stone into the creation of Copa Libertadores. In 2009, when the IFFHS proclaimed Peñarol of Montevideo as the best South American team of the 20th century, they took into consideration the Copa Aldao and other international club tournaments played in South America before the beginning of Copa Libertadores in 1960.

In August 2015 a CONMEBOL's article described Aldao Cup as one of the first international professional football cups in South America. 

Many important footballers played in the competitions such as the Argentines Jose Manuel Moreno, Angel Labruna, Guillermo Stabile, Alfredo Di Stefano, Adolfo Pedernera,  Amadeo Carrizo, Carlos Peucelle, Felix Loustau, Nestor Rossi, Antonio Sastre, Bernardo Gandulla, the Italian-born Renato Cesarini, the Uruguayans Roque Maspoli, Ángel Romano, Obdulio Varela, Hector Scarone, Juan Alberto Schiaffino, Anibal Paz, Severino Varela and Paraguayan legend Arsenio Erico, among others.

History

Friendly matches were common between clubs from Argentina and Uruguay in the early 1900s due to the close proximity of the nations. Inevitably, a match to decide which national champions were the best formulated; the trophy of the competition was donated by Ricardo Aldao, then president of both, club Gimnasia y Esgrima (BA) and dissident association "Federación Argentina de Football". As such, the competition was named after his donation. The first edition, organized in 1913, was to be contested between Estudiantes from Argentina and River Plate from Uruguay. However, the match was suspended due to heavy rain and never rescheduled. The first champion of the competition was not crowned until 1916, when Nacional of Montevideo beat Racing de Avellaneda  2–1.

Originally, a single-legged format was adopted, with the match played in Argentina and Uruguay in alternative year. But in 1940, Boca Juniors left the field when the match, played at Montevideo, was at a draw of 2–2 and headed for extra-time. The title was awarded to Nacional at first, yet later on both associations did not defined clearly the champions of this year. Asociación Uruguaya de Fútbol (AUF) and Argentine Football Association (AFA) studied the situation on 22 January 1941, and announced that a two-legged format would be adopted in the following seasons. The finals should be disputed before the beginning of the next season. Only players that had been part of the domestic champion squads could be included. Since then, the competition was played two-legged exception made of the 1942 edition, when the second leg was not played and the trophy was not awarded.

Schedule problems forced teams of both countries to quit the Aldao Cup during the 1950s, thus the competition was discontinued until 1959. One last attempt was made to rekindle the championship in 1955 in a match between Nacional and River Plate. However, the final was not disputed until four years later and the second leg was never played; therefore, the title was not officially proclaimed. As a result, to the schedule congestion of the growing national leagues (as well as the creation of the new continental club tournament, the Copa Libertadores de América) the Copa Aldao became redundant and was never played again.

Finals
Below is a list with all the finals played. Since 1941, it was ruled that the cup would be defined in two legs.

Notes

Titles by club

Titles by country

All-time top scorers

Most finals by player
6:  Atilio García (won 2),  Anibal Paz (won 2) 
5:  Hector Scarone (won 4),  José Manuel Moreno (won 4)
4:  Angel Labruna (won 3),  Alfredo Foglino (won3),  Ricardo Vaghi (won 3),  Adolfo Pedernera (won 3), Felix Loustau (won 3),  Angel Romano (won 3),  Roberto Porta (won 1),
3:  Alberto Marcovecchio (won 3),  Carlos Peucelle (won 3),  Carlos Scarone (won 2),  Hector Castro (won 1),  Severino Varela (won 0)

See also
 South American Championship of Champions
 Copa Campeonato del Río de la Plata

References

a
a
a
a
a
a